Rebecka Belldegrun (born 1950), is a Finnish-born Israeli-American ophthalmologist, billionaire businesswoman and investor.

Early life and education

Belldegrun was born in Helsinki, Finland to Pola and Shlomo Zabludowicz. Her younger brother is Poju Zabludowicz. She received her medical degree from the Sackler School of Medicine at Tel Aviv University, and later completed her Ophthalmic Surgery residency in Israel, and her fellowship in corneal surgery at Harvard Medical School.

Career

In 1986, Belldegrun founded Intertech Corporation, a New York-based real estate company specializing in real estate development, investments, and acquisitions. She expanded Intertech's businesses and holdings to include interests in high-tech, biotechnology, hotel management and industrial manufacturing in the United States, England, Scandinavia, Eastern Europe and Israel. She served as the president of the company until 2003.

Belldegrun is the CEO and president of Bellco Capital, a Los Angeles-based venture capital firm which she founded in 2003. Bellco Capital focuses on finding seed investments and experienced management to early-stage and start-up companies, as well as on leveraged acquisitions of, and growth equity investments in leading middle-market enterprises. The company's business transactions include international private equity investments in retail, high-tech, biotechnology and real estate.

Board memberships

Belldegrun is a member of a number of boards, including:
BabyFirstTV – director
Brentwood School – chairman emeritus of the board of trustees
California Institute of Technology – trustee
LACMA – trustee
Institute for Strategic Threat Analysis and Response at the University of Pennsylvania – member of the external advisory board
LSM at the University of Pennsylvania – member of the advisory board
 Kronos Bio – director
 Breakthrough Properties – director

In the past, Belldegrun was a member of the following boards:
Columbia University – member of the board of visitors
Interdisciplinary Center Herzliya – member of the board of trustees
RAND Corporation – member of the board of advisors 
USC Center on Public Diplomacy – member of the advisory board

Personal life

Belldegrun is married to Arie Belldegrun and together they have four children. They reside in Bel Air, an affluent neighborhood in Los Angeles.

In 2021, in its annual ranking of the wealthiest people in Israel, Forbes Israel ranked Rebecka and Arie Belldegrun 36th with a personal net worth of $1.75 billion. They have donated over $1 million to the University of Pennsylvania School of Arts and Sciences, and have donated a $5 million sculpture to LACMA.

References

External links
Rebecka Belldegrun on Businessweek

1950 births
Living people
American billionaires
American health care businesspeople
American investors
American ophthalmologists
American people of Finnish-Jewish descent
American people of Polish-Jewish descent
American real estate businesspeople
American venture capitalists
American women chief executives
Businesspeople from Los Angeles
Businesspeople in the pharmaceutical industry
Columbia University people
Finnish emigrants to the United States
Finnish people of Polish-Jewish descent
Reichman University
Jewish physicians
People from Bel Air, Los Angeles
Businesspeople from Helsinki
Physicians from California
RAND Corporation people
Tel Aviv University alumni
University of Pennsylvania people
University of Southern California people
Women ophthalmologists
21st-century American businesswomen
21st-century American businesspeople
21st-century American women physicians
21st-century American physicians
21st-century Israeli Jews
American women investors
21st-century American Jews
Jewish women in business
Finnish Jews